Faisal Rahman is an Indian politician belonging to Rashtriya Janata Dal. He was elected as a member of Bihar Legislative Assembly from Dhaka in 2015.

References

Living people
Rashtriya Janata Dal politicians
Year of birth missing (living people)
Bihar MLAs 2015–2020
Bihari politicians
Janata Dal (United) politicians